Bob and Mike Bryan were the two-time defending champions but lost in the quarterfinals to Daniel Nestor and Édouard Roger-Vasselin.
Nestor and Roger-Vasselin went on to win the title, defeating Marcin Matkowski and Nenad Zimonjić in the final, 6–2, 6–2.

Seeds
All seeds receive a bye into the second round.

Draw

Finals

Top half

Bottom half

References
Main Draw

Men's Doubles